Vinca herbacea, with common name herbaceous periwinkle, is a flowering plant native to eastern and southeastern Europe, from Austria south to Greece, and east to the Crimea, and also in northern Western Asia, in the Caucasus and Alborz mountains.

It grows mainly in steppe habitats.

Description

The flowers are produced in late summer, blue-violet or occasionally white,  diameter, with a five-lobed corolla.

Cultivation
Vinca herbacea is occasionally grown as an ornamental plant in temperate climate gardens, as a rock garden plant.

References

Further reading
 Huxley, A., ed. (1992). New RHS Dictionary of Gardening 4: 664-665. Macmillan.

External links
 Hlasek.com: photo

herbacea
Vines
Flora of Europe
Flora of Western Asia
Flora of Austria
Flora of Bulgaria
Flora of Greece
Flora of Lebanon
Flora of Romania
Flora of Ukraine
Flora of the Crimean Peninsula
Plants described in 1753
Taxa named by Carl Linnaeus
Garden plants of Asia
Garden plants of Europe
Flora of Lebanon and Syria
Flora of Syria